The 1920 Louisiana gubernatorial election was held on April 20, 1920.  Like most Southern states between the Reconstruction Era and the Civil Rights Movement, Louisiana's Republican Party had virtually no electoral support.   This meant that the Democratic Party primary held on January 20 was the real contest over who would be governor.  The election resulted in the election of John M. Parker as governor of Louisiana.

Results  
Democratic Party Primary, January 20, 1920."

General Election, April 20, 1920

References

Sources 

 State of Louisiana.  Compilation of Primary Election Returns of the Democratic Party, State of Louisiana, 1920. 

1920
Gubernatorial
Louisiana
April 1920 events